The Blechhammer area was the location of Nazi Germany chemical plants, prisoner of war (POW) camps, and forced labor camps. Labor camp prisoners began arriving as early as June 17, 1942, and in July 1944, 400–500 men were transferred from the Terezin family camp to Blechhammer. The mobile "pocket furnace" crematorium was at Sławięcice.) and Bau und Arbeits Battalion (BAB) 21 was a mile from the Blechhammer oil plants and was not far from Kattowitz and Breslau.  Blechhammer synthetic oil production began April 1, 1944 with 4000 prisoners, with the slave labor camp holding these prisoners during April 1944, becoming a satellite camp of the dreaded Auschwitz extermination camp, as Arbeitslager Blechhammer.

Chemical plants
Two plants in the area, Blechhammer North (south of Sławięcice) and Blechhammer South at Azoty ( from the labor camp) were nicknamed  "Black Hammer" by Allied bomber aircrews. Similar to the Gelsenberg plant, the Blechhammer plants used bituminous coal in the Bergius process to synthesize Ersatz oil. In June 1944, the United States Army Air Forces considered Blechhammer one of the four "principal synthetic oil plants in Germany", and after the Fifteenth Air Force had dropped 7,082 tons (14,164,000 lbs; 6,424 tonnes) of bombs on Blechhammer, the Blechhammer plants were dismantled post-war by the Soviets.

Evacuation
In March 1945 the POWs were evacuated. One camp went to Regensburg, BAB 21 went to Landshut)  and on January 25, labor camp prisoners were force-marched for five days to Bergen Belsen (about 20% died en route). Some small groups did manage to escape (see František R. Kraus).

The "7 Company" was the guard battalion for Blechhammer, and the 1945 Belsen Trial convicted Blechhammer staff members Karl Francioh and Ansgar Piche.

Camps
The Blechhammer complex contained a number of POW Camps': BAB 21 (E794), 40, 48; E3, E714, E769, Camp 139.

Life at Blechhamer and the work parties is described in Captive Plans'', the POW diary of Reg Beattie and by a Czech survivor, journalist František R. Kraus.

See also
Polish areas annexed by Nazi Germany
Monowitz concentration camp
Oil Campaign of World War II
Territorial changes of Poland after World War II

References

External links 

Auschwitz concentration camp
History of Lesser Poland
Oil campaign of World War II
Nazi war crimes in Poland
Reich Security Main Office
World War II prisoner of war camps in Germany